The thyroid lymph nodes are deep anterior cervical lymph nodes found near the thyroid gland on the neck.

Lymphatics of the head and neck